Provolone is an Italian cheese. Provolone-type cheeses are also produced in other countries. The most important provolone production region today is Northwestern Italy and the city of Cremona. Provolone, provola, and provoleta are versions of the same basic cheese. Some versions of provolone are smoked.

History and varieties
The term provolone (meaning "large provola") appeared around the end of the 19th century, when it started to be manufactured in the southern regions of Italy and assumed its current large size. The smaller sized variant is called provola  and comes in plain and smoked (affumicata) varieties.

Modern provolone is a full-fat cow's milk cheese with a smooth skin, produced mainly in the Po River Valley regions of Lombardy and Veneto.

Provolone is a semi-hard cheese with taste varying greatly from provolone piccante (sharp, piquant), aged for a minimum of four months and with a very sharp taste, to provolone dolce (sweet) with a very mild taste. In provolone piccante, the distinctive piquant taste is produced with lipase (enzyme) derived from goat. The dolce version uses calf's lipase instead.

Both Provolone Valpadana and Provolone del Monaco (meaning "monk's provolone"; from the Naples area of Italy) have received Protected Designation of Origin (PDO) from the European Union, meaning no country other than Italy may legally produce a cheese called that.

The cheese when served this way is often called provoleta in Spanish.

See also

 List of cheeses
 List of stretch-curd cheeses
 Pizza cheese

References

Italian cheeses
Cuisine of Campania
Cow's-milk cheeses
Italian products with protected designation of origin
Cheeses with designation of origin protected in the European Union
Smoked cheeses
Stretched-curd cheeses
Lombard cheeses